Muzak is an American brand of background music played in retail stores and other public establishments. The name has been in use since 1934 and has been owned by various companies. In 1981, Westinghouse bought the company and ran it until selling it to the Fields Company of Chicago, publishers of the Chicago Sun-Times, on September 8, 1986. Formerly owned by Muzak Holdings, the brand was purchased in 2011 by Mood Media in a deal worth US$345 million. Muzak was based in various Seattle, Washington locations from 1986 to 1999, after which it moved its headquarters to South Carolina in 2000.

The word Muzak has been a registered trademark since December 21, 1954, of Muzak LLC. In the United States, due in part to the company’s market dominance, Muzak has come to be used to refer to most forms of background music, regardless of source. It may also be referred to as "elevator music" or "lift music." Though Muzak Holdings was for many years the best-known supplier of background music, and is commonly associated with elevator music, the company itself did not supply music to elevators. Since 1997, Muzak has used original artists for its music, except on its Environmental channel.

History
Inventor Major General George Owen Squier, credited with inventing telephone carrier multiplexing in 1910, developed the original technical basis for Muzak. He was granted several US patents in the 1920s related to transmission of information signals, among them  a system for the transmission and distribution of signals over electrical lines.

Squier recognized the potential for this technology to be used to deliver music to listeners without the use of radio, which at the time was in early state and required fussy and expensive equipment. Early successful tests were performed, delivering music to customers on New York's Staten Island via their electrical wires.

In 1922, the rights to Squier's patents were acquired by the North American Company utility conglomerate, which created the firm Wired Radio, Inc. to deliver music to their customers, charging them for music on their electric bill. By the 1930s radio had made great advances, and households began listening to broadcasts received via the airwaves for free, supported by advertising.

Focus on mercantile environment (1935–1950) 
Squier remained involved in the project, but as the home market became eclipsed by radio in 1934 he changed the company's focus to delivering music to commercial clients. Intrigued by the made-up word Kodak used as a trademark, he took the first syllable from "music" and added "ak" from "Kodak" to create Muzak, which became the company's new name.

In 1937, the Muzak division was purchased from the North American Company by Warner Bros., which expanded it into other cities. It was bought by entrepreneur William Benton who wanted to introduce Muzak into new markets like barbershops and doctors' offices. While Muzak had initially produced tens of thousands of original artist recordings by the top performers of the late 1930s and 1940s, their new strategy required a different sound.

Stimulus progression (1950–1960)
The company began customizing the pace and style of the music provided throughout the workday in an effort to maintain productivity. The music was programmed in 15-minute blocks, gradually getting faster in tempo and louder and brassier in instrumentation, to encourage workers to speed up their pace. Following the completion of a 15-minute segment, the music would fall silent for 15 minutes. This was partly done for technical reasons, but company-funded research also showed that alternating music with silence limited listener fatigue, and made the "stimulus" effect of Stimulus Progression more effective.

During this period, Muzak began recording their own "orchestra"actually a number of orchestras in studios around the country, sometimes in other countries as wellcomposed of top local studio musicians. This allowed them to control all aspects of the music for insertion into specific slots in the Stimulus Progression programs.

In the 1950s, it gradually became public knowledge that Muzak was using music to manipulate behavior. There were accusations of brainwashing, and court challenges.  However, its popularity remained high through the mid-1960s. President Dwight D. Eisenhower was the first president to pump Muzak into the West Wing, and Lyndon B. Johnson owned the Muzak franchise in Austin, Texas. NASA reportedly used Muzak in many of its space missions to soothe astronauts and occupy periods of inactivity.

Original artist programming (1960–1980)
With the rise in youth culture and the growing influence of the baby boomer generation in the 1960s and 1970s, Muzak's popularity declined. It began losing market share to new "foreground music" companies, such as AEI Music Network Inc. and Yesco, that offered so-called "original artist music programming." Rather than using orchestral re-recordings as Muzak had for its Stimulus Progression program, they licensed original recordings, and included vocal music. They also differed many styles, from rock and pop to Spanish-language programming (for Mexican restaurants), jazz, blues and classical, as well as the traditional "easy listening." Foreground music markets included restaurants, fashion stores, retail outlets, malls, dental offices, airlines and public spaces.

Muzak merged with Yesco in September 1986. When Muzak began programming original artists in 1984, it was after merging with Yesco, and the programming was done by Yesco. This necessitated abandonment of the Stimulus Progression concept.

A small contingent of Muzak's business continued to provide their trademarked background music sound where it remained popular, particularly in Japan.

New business model
Muzak was, since the 1940’s, a franchise operation, with local offices each purchasing performance licenses for subscribers to the music, delivery technology, and brand name for their geographic areas. The company (franchisor) changed hands several times, becoming a division of the Field Corporation in the mid-1980s.

Through the 1980s and 1990s, Muzak moved away from the "elevator music" approach and instead began to offer multiple specialized channels of popular music. Muzak pioneered "audio architecture", a process of designing custom music playlists for specific customers.

Even with the changes in format, rocker Ted Nugent used Muzak as an icon of everything "uncool" about music. In 1986, he publicly made a $10 million bid to purchase the company with the stated intent of shutting it down. "Muzak is an evil force in today's society, causing people to lapse into uncontrollable fits of blandness," Nugent said. "It's been responsible for ruining some of the best minds of our generation." His bid was refused by Muzak's then-owner, the Westinghouse Electric Corporation. 

By the late 1990s, the Muzak corporation had largely rebranded itself. As of 2010, Muzak distributed 3 million commercially available original artist songs.  It offered almost 100 channels of music via satellite or IP delivery, in addition to completely custom music programs tailored to their customers' needs.

According to EchoStar, one of Muzak's distribution providers, Muzak's business music service was broadcast on rented bandwidth from EchoStar VII, in geostationary orbit at 119 degrees west longitude. Other rented bandwidth included an analog service on Galaxy 3C and a digital service on SES-3.

On April 12, 2007, Muzak Holdings, LLC announced to its employees that it might merge with DMX Music. This merger was approved by the Department of Justice Antitrust Division one year later. However, by April 2009, the deal appeared to have faltered.

On January 23, 2009, a spokesperson said Muzak was attempting to restructure its debt, and filing for bankruptcy was one of several options. The company had ample cash but had large amounts of debt coming due in the midst of a difficult economic climate.

Bankruptcy
On February 10, 2009, Muzak Holdings LLC filed for Chapter 11 bankruptcy protection. Kirkland & Ellis was hired as the company's bankruptcy law firm. Moelis & Company served as the financial adviser.

On September 10, 2009, Muzak said it had filed a reorganization plan which would cut the company's debt by more than 50%. The plan would pay all banks everything they were owed in some form and would give high-ranking unsecured creditors ownership in the reorganized company. Other creditors would receive warrants to buy stock. The company said an "overwhelming majority" of unsecured creditors supported the plan.

History of Muzak Holdings LLC

On January 12, 2010, the U.S. Bankruptcy Court approved the plan to reduce Muzak's debt by more than half, allowing Muzak to officially emerge from bankruptcy.

Following bankruptcy, the company announced an initiative to realign its corporate structure into three specialized business units: Muzak Media; Touch, a Muzak Co.; and Muzak Systems. These units will focus on content acquisition, Sensory Branding, and new delivery platform technology.

In March 2011, Mood Media agreed to purchase Muzak Holdings for $345 million. On February 5, 2013, Mood Media announced it was retiring the name 'Muzak' as part of its integration plans.

Mood Media
Founded in 2004, Mood Media had a market capitalization of about $380 million as of 2011. In March 2011, Mood Media agreed to purchase Muzak Holdings for $345 million. Although Muzak first appeared in 1934, it had its largest impact in the 1960s and 1970s. In 2013, Mood Media announced it would be consolidating its services under the name Mood, ceasing to use the Muzak brand name. Muzak provided background music to over 300,000 US locations and made most of its money through multi-year contracts. In 2013, the company provided on-hold messaging and video programming, although piped music remained its forte. Mood hoped to use Muzak's US footprint to introduce more digital services. In May 2017, Mood Media filed for Chapter 15 bankruptcy protection in an attempt to restructure their debt. The following month the company was acquired by Apollo Global Management and GSO Capital Partners. In January 2021 Mood Media was acquired by Vector Capital, a private equity firm specializing in investments in technology businesses.

See also
 Applied Media Technologies Corporation
 Associated-Rediffusion
 3M Cantata 700
 InStore Broadcasting Network
 Music Choice
 Seeburg 1000
 Trusonic

References

External links

Lanza, Joseph . Elevator Music: A Surreal History of Muzak, University of Michigan Press, 
Muzak Article about elevator music
The Soundtrack of Your Life New Yorker Article
Music, Muzak, Noise, Silence and Thought

Entertainment companies established in 1934
Products introduced in 1934
1937 mergers and acquisitions
1981 mergers and acquisitions
1986 mergers and acquisitions
2011 mergers and acquisitions
Brands that became generic
Easy listening music
Industrial music services
Music companies of the United States
Recorded music
Companies that filed for Chapter 11 bankruptcy in 2009